G Muniyasamy (born 2 January 1958 in Ramanathapuram Tamil Nadu) is a politician from Indian state of Tamil Nadu.

On 18 June 2013, he was appointed as the Chairman of Tamil Nadu Warehousing Corporation. He previously served as the AIADMK District Secretary, Ramanathapuram.

Political career
[1996-2001]       Union Chairman Mandapam, Ramanathapuram District.
[2000-2002]       District Secretary AIADMK, Ramanathapuram District.
[2003-2004]        District Secretary AIADMK, Ramanathapuram District.
[2006-2011]       District Councilor  Ramanathapuram District.
[2013] District       Secretary AIADMK, Ramanathapuram District.
[2013-2014]        Chairman of Tamil Nadu Warehousing Corporation

References

1958 births
Living people
All India Anna Dravida Munnetra Kazhagam politicians
Tamil Nadu politicians